Bobe may refer to:

Bobè, Benin
Bubi people or Bobe, a Bantu ethnic group of Central Africa
Bube language or Bobe, a Bantu language spoken by the Bubi people

People with the surname
T. O. Bobe (born 1969), Romanian poet
Mongezi Bobe (born 1981), South African footballer